Take a Chance is a 1933 American Pre-Code comedy film directed by Monte Brice and Laurence Schwab and written by Monte Brice, Buddy G. DeSylva, Laurence Schwab, Sid Silvers and Richard A. Whiting. It is based on the musical of the same name. The film stars James Dunn, June Knight, Lillian Roth, Cliff Edwards, Lilian Bond, Dorothy Lee and Lona Andre. The film was released on October 27, 1933, by Paramount Pictures.

Plot

Cast 
James Dunn as Duke Stanley
June Knight as Toni Ray
Lillian Roth as Wanda Hill
Cliff Edwards as Louie Webb
Lilian Bond as Thelma Green
Dorothy Lee as Consuelo Raleigh
Lona Andre as Miss Miami Beach
Charles "Buddy" Rogers as Kenneth Raleigh
Charles Richman as Andrew Raleigh
Robert Gleckler as Mike Caruso
Harry Shannon as Bartender

References

External links
 

1933 films
American comedy films
1933 comedy films
Paramount Pictures films
American black-and-white films
Films based on musicals
1930s English-language films
Films directed by Monte Brice
1930s American films